The Province of Ragusa (Sicilian: Pruvincia 'i Rausa) was a province in the autonomous region of Sicily in southern Italy, located in the south-east of the island. Following the abolition of the Sicilian provinces, it was replaced in 2015 by the Free municipal consortium of Ragusa. Its capital is the city of Ragusa, which is the most southerly provincial capital in Italy.

Geography
Along the Ragusan coast are many fishing villages such as Kaukana, Punta Secca, Marina di Ragusa and Marina di Modica. The Hyblaean Mountains are dominating the north of the province and its highest peaks are Monte Lauro, Monte Casale and Monte Arcibessi. The rivers of the province are the Irminio, Dirillo and Ippari and the only lake in the province is the Lago di Santa Rosalia along the course of the Irminio river. The skyline of Ragusa is punctuated by the towers, domes and cupolas of the many churches for which the province is known. The area is mostly unspoilt, as during the 19th century and early 20th century there was large migration from Ragusa to the more prosperous areas of Italy and abroad.

There are 12 comunes (Italian: comuni) in the province , see Comunes of the Province of Ragusa. By population, they are:

Economy

Parts of the province have changed dramatically in the late 20th and early 21st centuries, largely due to tourism. However, others are relatively unchanged from pre-industrial times. Main productive activities can be found in the towns of Ragusa and Pozzallo, where the two major industrial areas are located. The west and south of the province are mainly dedicated to the intensive farming in greenhouses and the local vegetables leave from the Market of Vittoria to be exported to all of Europe making the province of Ragusa one of the biggest producers of greenhouse produce. In the areas around Ragusa and Modica cattle farming is at the highest levels in the region for milk, dairy and meat production. Tourism has now replaced the fishing industry as the principal source of employment along the coast.

Transports
There are no motorways in the province and the main roads are the National SS.115 that crosses from west (Gela) to east (Syracuse) and the SS.514 that running north connects Ragusa to Catania. The SP.25 (Provincial Road) runs south from Ragusa to Marina di Ragusa.
The  of railway network of the province are entirely on single track and not electrified. Regional trains run regularly connecting the major cities.
Comiso Airport during the cold-war was the biggest NATO base in Europe and has recently been refurbished to be converted from military to civil airport.
The Port of Pozzallo is the only cargo and passengers port (service to Malta), and is located in the southern part of the province.
The other ports are either fishing ports like Scoglitti and Donnalucata or Marinas for touristic boats like Marina di Ragusa and Punta Secca.

Main sights

Baroque

The cities of Ragusa, Modica and Scicli contain many examples of baroque architecture and from 2002 are part of the World Heritage. The main monuments are:
Cathedral of San Giovanni (Ragusa)
Portal of San Giorgio (Ragusa Ibla)
Duomo of San Giorgio (Ragusa Ibla)
San Giorgio Cathedral, Modica
Duomo of San Pietro (Modica)
Church of San Bartolomeo (Scicli)
Palazzo Beneventano (Scicli)

Archeology
The main archeological site of the province is the Greek city of Kamarina located on the coast.
Others are Kasmenai, Akrillai, Scornavacche, Kaukana (Roman), the Roman Baths of Comiso and the Cava Ispica.

Castles
Castle of Donnafugata, near Ragusa, is a beautiful example of country residence of the Baron Corrado Arezzo that dominates the surrounding countryside.
Castle of the Counts of Modica in Modica town centre.
Castle of Naselli d’Aragona in Comiso dating to 1576.
Ruins of the fortress of Parco Forza in Ispica.
Acate is housing the Castle of the Prince of Biscari constructed originally in 1494, it is a commanding feature of the town square. The construction of the castle was ordered by Baron Guglielmo Raimondo Paternò, its golden coloured stone work has been modified many times during its long history, it now appears more as an 18th-century palazzo than a castle, although some crenelations and towers remain.

See also
 Monti Iblei Cup (Hill Climb)

References

External links

  Official website
 The province of Ragusa
 Images of Ragusa
 Pictures, history, tourism, gastronomy, books, local products, local surnames, transportation in the province of Ragusa
 Ragusa on line

 
Ragusa